Ali Morteza Samsam Bakhtiari (1945 – 30 October 2007) was an Iranian author and oil expert employed by the National Iranian Oil Company (NIOC).  He held a number of senior positions with this organization beginning in 1971. He was also an adviser to the Oil Depletion Analysis Centre.

Biography
Bakhtiari was a member of the Bakhtiari tribe.

He held a Ph.D. in chemical engineering from the Swiss Federal Institute of Technology in Zurich, Switzerland.  He had been a part-time lecturer for the Technical Faculty at Tehran University for many years.  Bakhtiari wrote a number of short essays and is the author of Peaks and Troughs which is about the modern history of Iran.

Bakhtiari suggested that it would require an act of god for the world to avoid warring over depleting energy resources.  He also believed that a peak in natural gas would be more shocking than peak oil because natural gas is less fluid and requires pipelines and LNG facilities to export overseas.

Bakhtiari was featured in the 2004 documentary The End of Suburbia.

Bakhtiari died suddenly of a heart attack in 2007. His funeral and burial were in Tehran.  He was survived by his children, Amir Bahman and Golbenaz Samsam Bakhtiari.

Quotes
"The big risk in Saudi Arabia is that Ghawar's rate of decline increases to an alarming point.  That will set bells ringing all over the oil world because Ghawar underpins Saudi output and Saudi undergirds worldwide production." 
"As for Iran, the usually accepted official  is almost  over any realistic assay."

Bibliography

See also
Colin Campbell
Kenneth S. Deffeyes
Richard Heinberg
Chris Skrebowski
Matthew Simmons

References

External links
 A collection of articles written by Bakhtiari

2007 deaths
Date of birth missing
1945 births
Bakhtiari people
People from Masjed Soleyman
20th-century Iranian engineers
Iranian non-fiction writers
20th-century non-fiction writers
Deaths from heart disease